This is a list of records and achievements of professional tennis players.

Men

Andre Agassi

Boris Becker

Björn Borg

Jimmy Connors

Jim Courier

Novak Djokovic

Stefan Edberg

Roger Federer

Rod Laver

Ivan Lendl

John McEnroe

Andy Murray

Rafael Nadal

Ilie Năstase

Andy Roddick

Ken Rosewall

Pete Sampras

Guillermo Vilas

Mats Wilander

Michael Chang

Lleyton Hewitt

Goran Ivanišević

Bob and Mike Bryan

Women

Evonne Goolagong Cawley

Margaret Court

Chris Evert

Steffi Graf

Justine Henin

Martina Hingis

Martina Navratilova

Monica Seles

Maria Sharapova

Serena Williams

Venus Williams

Billie Jean King

See also 

 All-time tennis records – Men's singles
 All-time tennis records – Women's singles
 Open Era tennis records – Men's singles
 Open Era tennis records – Women's singles
 ATP Tour records
 WTA Tour records
 List of Grand Slam–related tennis records
 Tennis Masters Series records and statistics

References

History of tennis
Records Open Era